Harvey Shore (born 14 February 1947) is an Australian film and television writer-producer. Shore was the producer of the children's TV show, Simon Townsend's Wonder World  from 1980 to 1986, which won five Logie Awards during his tenure.

Early life
Harvey Shore was born on 14 February 1947 and grew up in Sydney. His father, Irvin Alfred (Ray) Shore (13 February 1905 – 1962), was a financial manager and his mother, Ivy Shore (née Williams, 14 January 1915 – 25 August 1999), (known to her friends as 'Billie') was a seamstress and secretary from Adelaide who later became an award-winning portrait artist – in 1979 she won the Portia Geach Memorial Award. His younger brother, Russell Shore (born 29 April 1949), later became a naval officer and a Master Mariner. In 1960 his parents separated and, after the death of Ray in 1962, Ivy settled into a lifetime partnership with the tonal impressionist artist, Graeme Inson. Harvey Shore was educated at Cranbrook School and later at Marist Brothers Agricultural College. After matriculating in December 1964, he won a scholarship to the Royal Military College, Duntroon. In 1968 Shore graduated, and upon doing so, cadets are promoted to the rank of lieutenant and receive a Diploma in Military Arts and Leadership. He served in the Australian Intelligence Corps of the Regular Army until 1972.

Film and television career
From 1972, Harvey Shore began a career as a writer-producer in film and television when he was invited to write a script for the ABC program Behind The News. This led to regular work on this show, and within a year he was Lead Writer for Behind The News, and soon became its script editor. He also began writing for commercial TV shows such as the soap opera Number 96, and producing short films for the Sydney Filmmakers Co-op. His career now exceeds 3,000 hours of broadcast credits, including work on more than 30 feature films and over 60 television shows – in roles from scriptwriter to executive producer. From 1980 to 1986 Shore worked as producer of children's TV series, Simon Townsend's Wonder World, which had started in 1979 by journalist, Simon Townsend. The show won five Logie Awards during Shore's tenure: 'Outstanding Contribution to Children's Television' in 1980, 'Best Children's Television Series' in 1981, 'Most Popular Children's Program' in 1983, 1984 and 1985. For his other film and television work, Harvey Shore has also won two AFI (Australian Film Institute) Awards, two International Broadcasting (Nagoya) Awards, a 'TV Star' Award, and the gold award for first prize at the Asian Broadcasting Union Festival, among many other awards.

Shore studied scriptwriting at the Australian Writers' Guild (AWG), instructed by Elizabeth Kata (A Patch of Blue) and Harold Lander (Flashpoint). Later he was the Chairman of the Associates Committee of the AWG, and taught scriptwriting there and at the Australian Broadcasting Corporation. Shore lectured on scriptwriting and producing in Australia and in Japan, and was senior scriptwriting tutor with Thomson Education Direct and Cengage Education (now called Open Colleges) for over a decade. He was a script reader for the Australian Film Commission, and for Village Roadshow Limited. He has been a lead writer and a script editor (as well as a producer and executive producer) for the Australian Broadcasting Corporation; and has written and produced several hundred TV shows, from his first effort in 1972, to later documentaries such as Life Under Adolf Hitler for History Films. Shore has also written, produced and hosted several radio series for Australian Broadcasting Corporation and for commercial radio networks – including the long-running syndicated video review program, "Videobiz".

Other work
Shore has been a Public Relations Consultant, and worked as PR Manager for Village Roadshow Limited, the Maritime Services Board of NSW, and several other companies. He has written two books and worked as Senior Tutor in Scriptwriting and in Public Relations for the distance learning companies The Australian College of Journalism and Cengage Education. Shore's TV experience and contacts also saw him writing long-running TV and pay-TV columns for MediaWeek, and also for Encore Magazine, a film and television industry journal. He currently writes a regular weekly newspaper column "Shorelines" for the News Corp Australia local newspaper "The Wynnum Herald".

Shore joined the Australian Volunteer Coast Guard in May 2007, serving with Coast Guard Brisbane (Queensland Flotilla Two) in Manly, Queensland. He was appointed Flotilla Media and PR Officer in 2009, and also gained Competent Crew ranking in November 2009. He won his first Operational Service Award in 2010, a Meritorious Service Award in November 2011, and was declared a Disaster Hero by the Queensland and Federal governments in May 2011, and won a Queensland Flood and Cyclone Citation from the state government in that year, for work performed with his flotilla shipmates during the Brisbane Floods of January. In 2013, the Governor General of Australia awarded him a National Emergency Medal (Australia) for his work saving lives and property in the 2010-2011 Queensland Floods. This medal was presented by Graham Quirk the Lord Mayor of Brisbane, at a civic reception on 20 September 2013. Harvey won a clasp for his Operational Service Award in October 2013, after completing 200 Marine Assistance operations at sea.

Bibliography

Filmography
Major Cousens
Jog’s Trot (short film)

Television work
Simon Townsend's Wonder World
Number 96
Behind the News
G.P.
Burke's Backyard
New Wonder World!

Radio credits
Video Biz
Around The World
The Way It Is
Mark Twain’s Australia

References

Additional sources

19. ^ "http://www.coastguard.com.au/latestnewss/79-heroes-win-101013"
Front page story and page 3 follow-on in Wynnum Herald regarding award of National Emergency Medal.

20. ^ "http://www.emergencyvolunteering.com.au/mobile/home/news/70-mobile-news/qld-news/432-medals-for-flood-heroes"
Article on Medals for Flood Heroes at Brisbane Coast Guard, by Volunteering Qld.

21. ^ "http://www.rossvasta.com.au/Media/Speeches/SpeechesinParliament/tabid/64/articleType/ArticleView/articleId/95/
Recommendation-for-National-Emergency-Medal-for-Coastguard-Brisbane.aspx"
Hansard extract in which Federal Member for Bonner Ross Vasta names 47 Brisbane Coast Guard members he recommends for National Emergency Medals.

22. ^ "http://www.opencolleges.edu.au/informed/tutor-talk/harvey-shore-personalising-the-experience/"

External links
 

1947 births
Living people
Australian male film actors
Australian television producers
Australian screenwriters
Australian male television actors
People from Sydney
Royal Military College, Duntroon graduates
People educated at Cranbrook School, Sydney